Milton station or Milton railway station may refer to:

In England:
Milton railway station (Staffordshire) in Milton, Staffordshire, England
Milton Range Halt railway station in Gravesend, Kent, England
Milton Regis Halt in Milton Regis
Milton Road Halt railway station in Gravesend, Kent, England
Milton Halt railway station in Milton, Oxfordshire, England
New Milton railway station in New Milton, Hampshire, England
Weston Milton railway station in Milton and Locking Castle, Weston-super-Mare, North Somerset, England 
Brampton railway station (Cumbria) near the village of Milton and previously known as Milton Station.

In Scotland:
Milton of Crathes railway station in Milton of Crathes, Scotland

In Canada:
Milton GO Station in Milton, Ontario, Canada

In the United States:
Milton station (MBTA) in Milton, Massachusetts, United States
Milton Railroad Station (New York) in Milton, New York, United States

In Australia:
Milton railway station, Brisbane in Brisbane, Australia